Omar (Umar) Sheikhulayev (5 June 1975 - 5 February 2009), also known as Emir Muaz, was the militant leader of the Vilayat Dagestan of the Caucasus Emirate, in the volatile southern Russian republic of Dagestan.

Biography
Omar was a close associate of Rappani Khalilov and Rasul Makasharipov. In December 2008 Dokku Umarov appointed him leader of the Shariat Jamaat as a successor to the slain Ilgas Malachiyev. He was accused of killing Deputy Chief of Staff of the North Regional Command of Internal Troops of the Russian Federation, Major General Lipinsky.

He was killed on 5 February 2009 in a fierce shoot-out with the Russian security forces outside of Makhachkala.

References 

1975 births
2009 deaths
People from Laksky District
Deaths by firearm in Russia
Russian Islamists
People of the Chechen wars
Russian rebels
Leaders of Islamic terror groups